Kuvandyksky District is an administrative district (raion), one of the thirty-five in Orenburg Oblast, Russia. Its administrative center is the town of Kuvandyk (which is not administratively a part of the district). Population: 19,545 (2010 Census);

Administrative and municipal status
Within the framework of administrative divisions, Kuvandyksky District is one of the thirty-five in the oblast. The town of Kuvandyk serves as its administrative center, despite being incorporated separately as an administrative unit with the status equal to that of the districts.

As a municipal division, the territory of the district and the territory of the Town of Kuvandyk are incorporated together as Kuvandyksky Urban Okrug. Prior to May 1, 2015, the district was incorporated as Kuvandyksky Municipal District, with the Town of Kuvandyk being incorporated within it as Kuvandyk Urban Settlement.

References

Notes

Sources



Districts of Orenburg Oblast